Des Barnes is a fictional character from the British ITV soap opera Coronation Street, played by Philip Middlemiss.

Storylines
Des was deeply in love with Steph (Amelia Bullmore), but she did not seem to care as deeply for him, and eventually left him for another man. Des had been building a boat in the back garden for years, and the date of the launch coincided with Steph leaving him. He burned the boat on a canal.

When Terry Duckworth (Nigel Pivaro) was in prison, Des offered his back garden to his ex wife Lisa (Caroline Milmoe) for their son Tommy to play in. His relationship with Lisa gradually strengthened, until Terry's mother Vera (Elizabeth Dawn) told Terry that Des and Lisa were spending time together. Terry subsequently arranged for some criminal associates outside prison to beat Des. Lisa found out that Terry was behind the beating and declared her marriage to Terry over, and moved back to Blackpool with her parents. Des visited Lisa several times, then asked her to move back to Weatherfield with him. Vera was furious, accusing Des of breaking up her son’s marriage and referring to him as a bookie's runner.

Lisa was killed in February 1993 when she was run over by a car whilst crossing the street from the Rovers. Des was affected a lot more than Terry. Tommy went to live with Lisa's parents in Blackpool, but Des still saw him when they brought him to Weatherfield to visit Vera and Jack (Bill Tarmey).

After Lisa's death, Des began dating Raquel Wolstenhulme (Sarah Lancashire). She eventually moved in with him, but she knew that he was never going to ask for her hand in marriage, breaking their relationship. However, the two were reconciled when Des advised against her seeing someone she had met on a modelling assignment. Soon after Des embarked on an affair with Tanya Pooley (Eva Pope), who was dating Des's boss, Alex Christie (Gavin Richards) at the time. Tanya could not resist Des and saw it as an opportunity to get at Raquel, whom she did not like and often bullied. One night Des went to see Tanya and found Alex with her. During the resulting fight between the two men, Raquel arrived and discovered the affair.

Raquel later got engaged to Curly Watts (Kevin Kennedy). Des appeared at their party and forced Raquel to admit that she did not really love Curly and Raquel later broke off their engagement but refused reconciliation with Des.

After this, Andy McDonald (Nicholas Cochrane) moved in as a lodger. Their friendship turned sour when Des started making offensive jokes about his family's criminality and asked Andy to leave.

Des then dated a young widow, Claire Palmer (Maggie Norris). They had brief meetings during their lunch breaks as Claire was trying to get her daughter Becky (Emily Aston) used to the idea of her mother dating another man. Des wanted Claire to take a boating holiday with him, and Becky thought that it was a good idea and wanted to go too. Becky accepted Des and when they returned from the boat trip Claire and Becky moved in with Des, even though this meant that Claire lost her widow’s pension.

In 1997, Des was talked into making a parachute jump with his boss Sean Skinner (Terence Hillyer) and Samantha Failsworth (Tina Hobley), the Rovers barmaid that Sean had been dating. Due to an ankle injury Sean was unable to take part in the jump. Des and Samantha were pleased that they had made the jump successful and later the same day Des made a pass at Samantha. She manipulated Des by pretending to reciprocate his feeling and had him remove his trousers. She threw his trousers out of the window and pushed Des out of the front door in full view of Claire, Rita Sullivan (Barbara Knox) and Mavis Wilton (Thelma Barlow).

Claire and Becky subsequently moved out and Sean fired Des from his job. Humiliated and ashamed, Des decided to leave Weatherfield. He rented his house out to Angie Freeman (Deborah McAndrew), bought himself a new boat and left, with Derek Wilton (Peter Baldwin) giving him a fond farewell.

However, Des returned to the Street soon after in July. Des was upset to find that Derek had died. He also found Angie had moved mechanic Chris Collins (Matthew Marsden) into the house with her. At first Des did not approve, but eventually accepted Chris.

In August, Des made another pass at Samantha and this time she genuinely accepted him. She was able to be consoled by Des, confessing to him her innermost feelings, including telling him of her rape ordeal to which she had never spoken about to anyone before. Des was angry when Samantha slept with her ex-husband Ritchie (Shaun Dooley), but she later divorced him and Des forgave her. Samantha later cheated on Des with Chris and their relationship ended.

After their separation, Des began dating Natalie Horrocks (Denise Welch). Samantha was jealous and told Des that she was pregnant with his child and had an abortion. Des discovered that Samantha had been lying about the pregnancy but she then told him that she had suffered a miscarriage. Samantha then told Des again that she had been lying and that she was still pregnant with his child and left Weatherfield shortly afterwards. Although Natalie firmly believed Samantha had been lying, Des was never sure of whether he had become a father or not.

In November 1998, just weeks after marrying Natalie, he walked into the living room of their home to find Natalie's son Tony (Lee Warburton) being attacked by a gang of drug dealers of Jez Quigley's to whom he owed money. When Des tried to stop the men from attacking his stepson, he was knocked unconscious and rushed to hospital. He appeared to be recovering and regained consciousness in hospital but then suffered a heart attack and died.

Reception
Des's character was, during his time on the soap, described as "the self-pitying Geordie of Coronation Street who hit his boss when he found him in bed with his girlfriend".

References

External links

Coronation Street characters
Fictional bookmakers
Television characters introduced in 1990
Male characters in television
Fictional murdered people